The 2015 Pacific Games women's football tournament was the fourth edition of the Pacific Games women's football tournament. The women's football tournament was held in Port Moresby, Papua New Guinea between 6–16 July 2015 as part of the 2015 Pacific Games. The tournament was open to full women's national teams (unlike the men's tournament, which was age-restricted).

The tournament also doubled as the first stage of the fourth edition of the OFC Women's Olympic Qualifying Tournament, the quadrennial international tournament organised by the Oceania Football Confederation (OFC) to determine which women's national teams from Oceania qualify for the Olympic football tournament. The highest-ranked team of this competition who is a member of the International Olympic Committee (IOC) advanced to the second stage against New Zealand, where the winner qualifies for the 2016 Summer Olympics women's football tournament.

Papua New Guinea won the gold medal for the fourth consecutive Pacific Games.

Teams
A total of seven teams participated in the tournament.

New Caledonia are ineligible for the Olympics as they are not affiliated to the IOC. Had they won the tournament, the runner-up would advance to the second stage of the OFC Women's Olympic Qualifying Tournament.

Venues

Group stage
The draw was held on 1 June 2015 at the OFC Headquarters at Auckland. The seven teams were drawn into one group of four teams and one group of three teams.

The top two teams of each group advanced to the semi-finals.

All times UTC+10.

Group A

Group B

Knockout stage

Semi-finals

Bronze medal match

Gold medal match

Papua New Guinea advanced to the second stage of the OFC Qualifying Tournament for the 2016 Summer Olympics; since New Caledonia are ineligible for the Olympics, Papua New Guinea would have advanced as the highest-ranked IOC member team regardless of the result.

Goalscorers
10 goals
 Christelle Wahnawe

5 goals
 Meagen Gunemba

4 goals
 Myranda Rabah

2 goals

 Liz Harmon
 Marielle Haocas
 Ramona Padio
 Fatima Rama
 Lusia Ioane

1 goal

 Maeva Carr
 Tepaeru Toka
 Sofi Diyalowai
 Sonali Rao
 Sydney Gatha
 Isabelle Hace
 Brenda Kenon
 Kim Maguire
 Céline Xolawawa
 Georgina Kaikas
 Marie Kaipu
 Kelsey Kapisi
 Hana Malo
 Hazel Peleti
 Cathy Aihunu
 Merina Joe
 Mele Akolo
 Mele Soakai

See also
Men's Football at the 2015 Pacific Games

References

External links
Official 2015 Pacific Games website
XV Pacific Games Women's Tournament, Official OFC website

Ofc, stage 1
2015, stage 1
Womens